Christianization or Christianisation is to make Christian; to imbue with Christian principles; to become Christian. It can apply to the conversion of an individual, a practice, a place or a whole society. It began in the Roman Empire, continued through the Middle Ages in Europe, and in the twenty-first century has spread around the globe.

Historically, there are observable stages in the process of Christianization beginning with 1) the mission period and individual conversion, followed by 2) consolidation and community building, and 3) the exchange of beliefs and sacred spaces sometimes referred to as syncretism. Having observable stages does not indicate Christianization has maintained one consistent approach to conversion throughout its long history. Different periods and places have produced a variety of methods, motives and means.

The first countries to make Christianity their state religion were Armenia, Georgia, Ethiopia and Eritrea in the fourth century. By the end of the fifth and beginning of the sixth century, the majority of the Roman Empire had been converted. Christian empire was finally created under the Eastern Emperor Justinian the first, when Ancient Christianity begins its end, and Christianity transforms into its eclectic medieval forms by the 800's.

Medieval Christianization began in Europe in the 8th and 9th centuries. A new region of Europe that later became known as Eastern Central Europe was formed, though not without some bloodshed, since throughout central and eastern Europe, Christianization and political centralization went hand in hand. The rulers of Bulgaria, Bohemia (which became Czechoslovakia), the Serbs and the Croats, along with Hungary, and Poland, voluntarily joined the Western, Latin church, sometimes pressuring their people to follow. The Christianization of the Kievan Rus', the ancestors of Belarus, Russia, and Ukraine, began in the tenth century following the path of Byzantine Christianity and becoming a true state church with state control of religion and some coercion.

The two centuries around the turn of the first millennium brought Europe's most significant Christianization of the Middle Ages. What had been two dangerous and aggressive enemies, (the Scandinavian Vikings on the northern borders, and the Hungarians in the east), voluntarily adopted Christianity and founded kingdoms that sought a place among the European states. The Northern Crusades, from 1147 to 1316, form a unique chapter in Christianization. They were not for the reclamation of lost territory, nor were they a defense against invasive Muslims; instead, they were largely political, led by local princes against their own enemies, for their own gain, and conversion by these princes was almost always a result of armed conquest. Colonialism was both supported and opposed by missionaries. Modern Christianization has become a global phenomenon.

Christianization
The first stage of Christianization begins when personal conversions take place. For nations, this has historically been associated with missions and missionaries, and is therefore called the mission period.

The second stage is consolidation. The convert's way of life begins to transform. Their world out-look changes and former customs, such as burial customs, are changed to reflect Christian practices. On a societal basis, Christian communities form; the first dedicated church structures are built; monasteries and dioceses are established; and the first parishes are created. During this stage, Christianization establishes schools and spreads education, translates Christian writings to local languages, often developing a script to do so, thereby creating the first literature of what had been a pre-literate culture.

The third step in the process of Christianization involves the interchange that occurs when two cultural systems interconnect. Christianization has never been a one-way process. In some cases the survival of local custom was encouraged by Christian missionaries, while other aspects of traditional religion survived despite the opposition of the missionaries.

According to archaeologist Anna Collar, when groups of people with different ways of life come into contact with each other, they naturally exchange ideas and practices. This is sometimes referred to as syncretism, but syncretism is a controversial concept, so instead, many scholars use the terms inculturation and acculturation instead. Anthropologist Aylward Shorter defines inculturation as the "ongoing dialogue" between Christian teachings and local culture. The church adapts itself to a particular local cultural context just as local culture and places are also adapted to the church. This has at times involved appropriation, removal and/or redesignation of aspects of native religion and former sacred spaces allowing them to find a place in the new religious system.

Variations in the results, according to Clark, are based largely on local ethnic composition, political structure and the local locus of power. Ancient Germanic societies tended to be communal by nature rather than oriented around individuality, and loyalty to the king meant the conversion of the ruler was generally followed by the mass conversion of his subjects. Clark has also written that different methods were used by different individual missionaries contributing to differing results.

Anthropologist Jerry E. Clark writes: "Acculturation has been defined as the changes that occur in one or both cultures when two different cultures come in contact. In the case of missionaries and the American Indians, the process of acculturation was purposely one-sided." Recent anthropological work on acculturation has led contemporary scholars to write that its traditional definition can only be used when both societies involved in exchange have some autonomy. In the case of a loss of political autonomy, as happened with native Americans, directed or forced acculturation produces an alternative definition. Robert F. Berkhofer references E. A. Hobble's definition as saying that acculturation under directed contact is "the process of interaction between two societies by which the culture of the society in subordinate position is drastically modified to conform to the culture of the dominant society."

History connects Christianization with colonialism, especially but not limited to the New World and other regions subject to settler colonialism. History also connects Christianization with opposition to colonialism. African historian Lamin Sanneh writes that there is an equal amount of evidence of both missionary support and missionary opposition to colonialism through "protest and resistance both in the church and in politics". "Despite their role as allies of the empire, missions also developed the vernacular that inspired sentiments of national identity and thus undercut Christianity's identification with colonial rule".

Integration happened when an individual engaged both their heritage culture and the larger society; assimilation or separation occurred when an individual became oriented exclusively to one or the other culture. Orientation to neither culture is marginalization. In the Late Middle Ages, and later colonialism, the mixture of religion with politics led to some instances of forced conversion by the sword, racialism and the marginalization of entire groups.

Ancient (Ante-Nicaean) Christianity (1st to 3rd centuries)

Early method

Christianization began in the Roman Empire in Jerusalem around 30–40 AD, spreading outward quickly. The Church in Rome was founded by Peter and Paul in the 1st century. There is agreement among twenty-first century scholars that Christianization of the Roman Empire in its first three centuries did not happen by imposition. Christianization of this period was the cumulative result of multiple individual decisions and behaviors.

While enduring three centuries of on again - off again persecution, from differing levels of government ranging from local to imperial, Christianity had remained 'self-organized' and without central authority. In this manner, it reached an important threshold of success between 150 and 250, when it moved from less than 50,000 adherents to over a million, and became self-sustaining and able to generate enough further growth that there was no longer a viable means of stopping it. Scholars agree there was a significant rise in the absolute number of Christians in the third century.

Characteristics

Early Christian communities were highly inclusive in terms of social stratification and other social categories. Many scholars have seen this inclusivity as the primary reason for Christianization's early success. The Apostolic Decree helped to establish Ancient Christianity as unhindered by either ethnic or geographical ties. Christianity was experienced as a new start, and was open to both men and women, rich and poor. Baptism was free. There were no fees, and it was intellectually egalitarian, making philosophy and ethics available to ordinary people including those who might have lacked literacy. Heterogeneity characterized the groups formed by Paul the Apostle, and the role of women was much greater than in any of the forms of Judaism or paganism in existence at the time.

Ante-Nicaean Christianity was also highly exclusive. Believing was the crucial and defining characteristic that set a "high boundary" that strongly excluded the "unbeliever". Keith Hopkins asserts: "It is this exclusivism, idealized or practiced, which marks Christianity off from most other religious groups in the ancient world". The early Christian had exacting moral standards that included avoiding contact with those that were seen as still "in bondage to the Evil One": (2 Corinthians 6:1-18; 1 John 2: 15-18; Revelation 18: 4; II Clement 6; Epistle of Barnabas, 1920). In Daniel Praet's view, the exclusivity of Christian monotheism formed an important part of its success, enabling it to maintain its independence in a society that syncretized religion.

Christian monasticism emerged in the third century, and monks soon became crucial to the process of Christianization. Their numbers grew such that, "by the fifth century, monasticism had become a dominant force impacting all areas of society".

Armenia, Georgia, Ethiopia and Eritrea
In 301, Armenia became the first kingdom in history to adopt Christianity as an official state religion. The transformations taking place in these centuries of the Roman Empire had been slower to catch on in Caucasia. Indigenous writing did not begin until the fifth century, there was an absence of large cities, and many institutions such as monasticism did not exist in Caucasia until the seventh century. Scholarly consensus places the Christianization of the Armenian and Georgian elites in the first half of the fourth century, although Armenian tradition says Christianization began in the first century through the Apostles Thaddeus and Bartholomew. This is said to have eventually led to the conversion of the Arsacid family, (the royal house of Armenia), through St. Gregory the Illuminator in the early fourth century.

Christianization took many generations and was not a uniform process. Robert Thomson writes that it was not the officially established hierarchy of the church that spread Christianity in Armenia. "It was the unorganized activity of wandering holy men that brought about the Christianization of the populace at large". The most significant stage in this process was the development of a script for the native tongue.

Scholars do not agree on the exact date of Christianization of Georgia, but most assert the early 4th century when Mirian III of the Kingdom of Iberia (known locally as Kartli) adopted Christianity. According to medieval Georgian Chronicles, Christianization began with Andrew the Apostle and culminated in the evangelization of Iberia through the efforts of a captive woman known in Iberian tradition as Saint Nino in the fourth century. Fifth, 8th, and 12th century accounts of the conversion of Georgia reveal how pre-Christian practices were taken up and reinterpreted by Christian narrators.

In 325, the Kingdom of Aksum (Modern Ethiopia and Eritrea) became the second country to declare Christianity as its official state religion.

Late antiquity (4th–5th centuries)

Peter Brown has written that, "it would be profoundly misleading" to claim that the cultural and social changes that took place in Late Antiquity reflected "in any way" a process of Christianization. Instead, the "flowering of a vigorous public culture that polytheists, Jews and Christians alike could share... [that] could be described as Christian "only in the narrowest sense" developed. It is true that Christianity made sure blood sacrifice played no part in that culture, but the sheer success and unusual stability of the Constantinian and post-Constantinian state also ensured that "the edges of potential conflict were blurred... It would be wrong to look for further signs of Christianization at this time. It is impossible to speak of a Christian empire as existing before Justinian".

Favoritism and hostility
The Christianization of the Roman Empire is frequently divided by scholars into the two phases of before and after the conversion of Constantine in 312. According to Harold A. Drake, Constantine's official imperial religious policies did not stem from faith as much as they stemmed from his duty as Emperor to maintain peace in the empire. Drake asserts that, since Constantine's reign followed Diocletian's failure to enforce a particular religious view, Constantine was able to observe that coercion had not produced peace.

Contemporary scholars are in general agreement that Constantine did not support the suppression of paganism by force. He never engaged in a purge, there were no pagan martyrs during his reign. Pagans remained in important positions at his court. Constantine ruled for 31 years and never outlawed paganism. A few authors suggest that "true Christian sentiment" might have motivated Constantine, since he held the conviction that, in the realm of faith, only freedom mattered.

Making the adoption of Christianity beneficial was Constantine's primary approach to religion, and imperial favor was important to successful Christianization over the next century. However, Constantine must have written the laws that threatened and menaced pagans who continued to practice sacrifice. There is no evidence of any of the horrific punishments ever being enacted. There is no record of anyone being executed for violating religious laws before Tiberius II Constantine at the end of the sixth century (574–582). Still, classicist Scott Bradbury notes that the complete disappearance of public sacrifice by the mid-fourth century "in many towns and cities must be attributed to the atmosphere created by imperial and episcopal hostility".

Paganism did not end when public sacrifice did. Brown explains that polytheists were accustomed to offering prayers to the gods in many ways and places that did not include sacrifice, that pollution was only associated with sacrifice, and that the ban on sacrifice had fixed boundaries and limits. Paganism thus remained widespread into the early fifth century continuing in parts of the empire into the seventh and beyond.

Rewriting history

Late Antiquity from the third to the sixth centuries was the era of the development of the great Christian narrative, an interpretatio Christiana of the history of humankind. In this reconstruction of the past, Christian writers built on preceding tradition, creating competing chronologies and alternative histories. In the early fourth century, Eusebius wrote Chronici canones. In it, he developed an elaborate synchronistic chronology reinterpreting the Greco-Roman past to reflect a Christian perspective. 

In the early fifth century Orosius wrote Historiae adversus paganos in response to the charge that the Roman Empire was in misery and ruins because it had converted to Christianity and neglected the old gods. Maijastina Kahlos explains that, "In order to refute these claims, Orosius reviewed the entire history of Rome, demonstrating that the alleged glorious past of the Romans in fact consisted of war, despair and suffering".

Theodosius I and orthodoxy

In the centuries following his death, Theodosius I gained a reputation as the emperor who crushed paganism in order to establish Nicene Christianity as the one official religion of the empire. Modern historians no longer see this as actual history, but instead, see it as a later interpretation of history – a rewriting of history - by Christian writers.

Nearly all the sources available on Theodosius are ecclesiastical histories that are highly colored and carefully curated for public reading. Beginning with contemporaries like the bishop Ambrose, and followed in the next century by church historians such as Theodoret, these histories focus on Theodosius' impact on the church as uniformly positive, orthodox and anti-pagan, frequently going beyond admiration into panegyric and hagiography. Cameron explains that, since Theodosius's predecessors Constantine, Constantius, and Valens had all been semi-Arians, it fell to the orthodox Theodosius to receive from Christian literary tradition most of the credit for the final triumph of Christianity. 

Theodosius did champion Christian orthodoxy, and the majority of the laws he wrote were intended to eliminate heresies and promote unity within Christianity. Scholars say there is little, if any, evidence that Theodosius I ever pursued an active policy against the traditional cults.

In 380, he issued the Edict of Thessalonica to the people of Constantinople. It was addressed to Arian Christians, granted Christians no favors or advantages over other religions, and it is clear from mandates issued in the years after 380, that Theodosius had not intended it as a requirement for pagans or Jews to convert to Christianity. Hungarian legal scholar Pál Sáry explains that, "In 393, the emperor was gravely disturbed that the Jewish assemblies had been forbidden in certain places. For this reason, he stated with emphasis that the sect of the Jews was forbidden by no law".

It has long been an accepted axiom that a universal ban on paganism, and the establishment of Christianity as the singular religion of the empire, can be implied from Theodosius' later laws such as that issued in November 392. This law was only sent to Rufinus in the East; it describes and bans all types of private domestic sacrifice, which were thought to have "slipped out from under public control"; it bans magic used for divining the future from such sacrifices, and any idolatry associated with those sacrifices. It makes no mention of Christianity at all. Sozomen, the Constantinopolitan lawyer, wrote a history of the church around 443 where he evaluates the law of 392 as having had only minor significance at the time it was issued.

During the reign of Theodosius, pagans were continuously appointed to prominent positions and pagan aristocrats remained in high offices. Theodosius allowed pagan practices that did not involve sacrifice to be performed publicly and temples to remain open. In his 2020 biography of Theodosius, Mark Hebblewhite concludes that Theodosius never saw himself, or advertised himself, as a destroyer of the old cults. The emperor's efforts at Christianization were "targeted, tactical, and nuanced".

Method
According to H. A. Drake, Christians worried about the validity of coerced faith and resisted such aggressive actions for centuries. Tertullian held that 'the free exercise of religious choice was a tenet of both man made and natural law', and that religion was 'something to be taken up voluntarily, not under duress". In Peter Garnsey's view, "Christians were the only group in antiquity to enunciate conditions for practicing religious toleration as a principle, rather than as an expedient".

In the fourth century, a council of Spanish Bishops meeting in Elvira on the coast of Spain, determined that Christians who died in attacks on idol temples should not be received as martyrs. The bishops wrote that they took this stand of disapproval because "such actions cannot be found in the Gospels, nor were they ever undertaken by the Apostles".

Drake suggests this stands as testimony to the tradition established in early Christianity which favored and operated toward peace, moderation, and conciliation. "It was a tradition that held true belief could not be compelled for the simple reason that God could tell the difference between voluntary and coerced worship". Peter Brown has written that, It would be a full two centuries before Justinian would envisage the compulsory baptism of remaining polytheists, and a further century until Heraclius and the Visigothic kings of Spain would attempt to baptize the Jews. In the fourth century, such ambitious schemes were impossible.

There is no evidence to indicate that conversion of pagans through force was an accepted method of Christianization at any point in Late Antiquity; all uses of imperial force concerning religion were aimed at Christian heretics such as the Donatists and the Manichaeans. Augustine, who advocated coercion for heretics, did not do so for the pagans or the Jews of his era, and the distinction between heretical Christians and non-believers continued to be made up to and through Aquinas in the thirteenth century.

Before the fifth century, there were isolated local incidents of anti-Jewish violence, and there were legislative pressures against specific pagan practices, but according to historians of forced conversion Mercedes García-Arenal and Yonatan Glazer-Eytan, it is only with the legislation introduced during the seventh century Visigothic period that a different view of the use of coercion or force began to develop in Spain.

Germanic conversions
The earliest references to the Christianization of the Germanic peoples are in the writings of Irenaeus (130–202 ), Origen (185-253), and Tertullian (Adv. Jud. VII) (155–220). Athanasius omits Germany from his list of Christianized peoples, but that is possibly because, by the 4th century, many from the Eastern Germanic tribes, notably the Goths, had adopted Arianism. Yet Eusebius who supported Bishop Arian also omits them without saying why. Noel Lenski writes that the emperor Valens offered encouragement rather than active sponsorship of Christianization beyond Roman borders.

Tacitus is an important early source describing the nature of German religion, and their understanding of the function of a king, as facilitating Christianization. Conversion of the West and East Germanic tribes sometimes took place "top to bottom" in the sense that missionaries aimed at converting Germanic nobility first. A king had divine lineage as a descendent of Woden. Ties of fealty between German kings and their followers often rested on the agreement of loyalty for reward; the concerns of these early societies were communal, not individual; this combination produced mass conversions of entire tribes following their king, trusting him to share the rewards of conversion with them accordingly. Afterwards, their societies began a gradual process of Christianization that took centuries, with some traces of earlier beliefs remaining.

 In 341, Romanian born Ulfila (Wulfilas, 311–383) became a bishop and was sent to instruct the Gothic Christians living in Gothia in the province of Dacia. Ulfilas is traditionally credited with the voluntary conversion of the Goths between 369 and 372. 
 The Vandals converted to Arian Christianity shortly before they left Spain for northern Africa in 429. 
 Clovis I converted to Catholicism sometime around 498, extending his kingdom into most of Gaul (France) and large parts of what is now modern Germany.
 The Ostrogothic kingdom, which included all of Italy and parts of the Balkans, began in 493 with the killing of Odoacer by Theodoric. They converted to Arianism. 
 Christianization of the central Balkans is documented at the end of the 4th century, where Nicetas the Bishop of Remesiana brought the gospel to "those mountain wolves", the Bessi.
 The Langobardic kingdom, which covered most of Italy, began in 568, becoming Arian shortly after the conversion of Agilulf in 607. Most scholars assert that the Lombards, who had lived in Pannonia and along the Elbe river, converted to Christianity when they moved to Italy in 568, since it was thought they had little to do with the empire before then. According to the Greek scholar Procopius (500-565), the Lombards had "occupied a Roman province for 40 years before moving into Italy". It is now thought that the Lombards first adopted Christianity while still in Pannonia. Procopius writes that, by the time the Lombards moved into Italy, "they appear to have had some familiarity already with both Christianity and some elements of Roman administrative culture".

In all these cases, Christianization meant "the Germanic conquerors lost their native languages. In the remaining parts of the Germanic world, that is, to the North and East of France, the Germanic languages were maintained, but the syntax, the conceptual framework underlying the lexicon, and most of the literary forms were thoroughly latinized".

St. Boniface led the effort in the mid-eighth century to organize churches in the region that would become modern Germany. As ecclesiastical organization increased, so did the political unity of the Germanic Christians. By the year 962, when Pope John XII anoints King Otto I as Holy Roman Emperor, "Germany and Christendom had become one". This union lasted until dissolved by Napoleon in 1806.

Ireland

Pope Celestine I (422-430) sent Palladius to be the first bishop to the Irish in 431, and in 432, St Patrick began his mission there. Scholars cite many questions (and scarce sources) concerning the next two hundred years. Relying largely on recent archaeological developments, Lorcan Harney has reported to the Royal Academy that the missionaries and traders who came to Ireland in the fifth to sixth centuries were not backed by any military force. 

Patrick and Palladius and other British and Gaulish missionaries aimed first at converting royal households. Patrick indicates in his Confessio that safety depended upon it. Communities often followed their king en masse. It is likely most natives were willing to embrace the new religion, and that most religious communities were willing to integrate themselves into the surrounding culture. Conversion and consolidation were long complex processes that took centuries.

Christianization of the Irish landscape was a complex process that varied considerably depending on local conditions. Ancient sites were viewed with veneration, and were excluded or included for Christian use based largely on diverse local feeling about their nature, character, ethos and even location.

The Irish monks developed a concept of peregrinatio where a monk would leave the monastery to preach among the 'heathens'. From 590, Irish missionaries were active in Gaul, Scotland, Wales and Britain.

Great Britain

The most likely date for Christianity getting its first foothold in Britain is sometime around 200. Recent archaeology indicates that it had become an established minority faith by the fourth century. It was largely mainstream, and in certain areas, had been continuous.

The conversion of the Anglo-Saxons was begun at about the same time in both the north and south of the Anglo-Saxon kingdoms in two unconnected initiatives. Irish missionaries led by Saint Columba, based in Iona (from 563), converted many Picts. The court of Anglo-Saxon Northumbria, and the Gregorian mission, who landed in 596, did the same to the Kingdom of Kent. They had been sent by Pope Gregory I and were led by Augustine of Canterbury with a mission team from Italy. In both cases, as in other kingdoms of this period, conversion generally began with the royal family and the nobility adopting the new religion first.

In early Anglo-Saxon England, non-stop religious development meant paganism and Christianity were never completely separate. Lorcan Harney has reported that Anglo-Saxon churches were not built by pagan barrows before the 11th century.

Frankish Empire

The Franks first appear in the historical record in the 3rd century as a confederation of Germanic tribes living on the east bank of the lower Rhine River. Clovis I was the first king of the Franks to unite all of the Frankish tribes under one ruler. According to legend, Clovis had prayed to the Christian god before his battle against one of the kings of the Alemanni, and had consequently attributed his victory to Jesus. The most likely date of his conversion to Catholicism is Christmas Day, 508, following that Battle of Tolbiac. He was baptized in Rheims.  The Frankish Kingdom became Christian over the next two centuries.

The conversion of the northern Saxons began with their forced incorporation into the Frankish kingdom in 776 by Charlemagne (r. 768–814). Thereafter, the Saxon's Christian conversion slowly progressed into the eleventh century. Saxons had gone back and forth between rebellion and submission to the Franks for decades. Charlemagne placed missionaries and courts across Saxony in hopes of pacifying the region, but Saxons rebelled again in 782 with disastrous losses for the Franks. In response, the Frankish King "enacted a variety of draconian measures" beginning with the massacre at Verden in 782 when he ordered the decapitation of 4500 Saxon prisoners offering them baptism as an alternative to death. These events were followed by the severe legislation of the Capitulatio de partibus Saxoniae in 785 which prescribes death to those that are disloyal to the king, harm Christian churches or its ministers, or practice pagan burial rites. His harsh methods of Christianization raised objections from his friends Alcuin and Paulinus of Aquileia. Charlemagne abolished the death penalty for paganism in 797.

Italy

Christianization throughout Italy in Late Antiquity allowed for an amount of religious competition, negotiation, toleration and cooperation; it included syncretism both to and from pagans and Christians; and it allowed for a great deal of secularism. Public sacrifice had largely disappeared by the mid-fourth century, but paganism in a broader sense did not end. Paganism continued, transforming itself over the next two centuries in ways that often included the appropriation and redesignation of Christian practices and ideas while remaining pagan.

In 529, Benedict of Nursia established his first monastery in the Abbey of Monte Cassino, Italy. He wrote the Rule of Saint Benedict based on "pray and work". This "Rule" provided the foundation of the majority of the thousands of monasteries that spread across what is modern day Europe thereby becoming a major factor in the Christianization of Europe.

Monasteries were models of productivity and economic resourcefulness teaching their local communities animal husbandry, cheese making, wine making, and various other skills. They were havens for the poor, hospitals, hospices for the dying, and schools. Medical practice was highly important, and monasteries are best known for their contributions to medical tradition. They also made advances in sciences such as astronomy. For centuries, nearly all secular leaders were trained by monks because, excepting private tutors who were still, often, monks, it was the only education available.

The formation of these organized bodies of believers gradually carved out a series of uniquely distinct social spaces with some amount of independence from other types of authority such as political and familial authority. This revolutionized social history for everyone, but especially for women who could become leaders of communities with great influence of their own.

Benedict's biographer Cuthbert Butler writes that "...certainly there will be no demur in recognizing that St. Benedict's Rule has been one of the great facts in the history of western Europe, and that its influence and effects are with us to this day."

Greece
Christianization was slower in Greece than in most other parts of the Roman empire. There are multiple theories of why, but there is no consensus. What is agreed upon is that, for a variety of reasons, Christianization did not take hold in Greece until the fourth and fifth centuries. Christians and pagans maintained a self imposed segregation throughout the period. In Athens, for example, pagans retained the old civic center with its temples and public buildings as their sphere of activity, while Christians restricted themselves to the suburban areas. There was little direct contact between them. J. M. Speiser has argued that this was the situation throughout the country, and that "rarely was there any significant contact, hostile or otherwise" between Christians and pagans in Greece. This would have slowed the process of Christianization. By the time Christianization showed up in Greece, many of the fundamental aspects of the two religious traditions had already become similar. Accommodations had been made in both directions allowing points of view acceptable to those who had previously been pagan.

Timothy Gregory says, "it is admirably clear that organized paganism survived well into the sixth century throughout the empire and in parts of Greece (at least in the Mani) until the ninth century or later". Gregory adds that pagan ideas and forms persisted most in practices related to healing, death, and the family. These are "first-order" concerns - those connected with the basics of life – which were not generally subjected to objections from theologians and bishops.

The Parthenon, the Erechtheion, and the Theseion were turned into churches, but Alison Frantz has won consensus support of her view that, aside from a few rare instances, temple conversions took place only after Late Antiquity, especially in the seventh century, after the displacements caused by the Slavic invasions.
Sept. 22nd, 529 has been regarded by some scholars as the symbolic marking [of] the end of antiquity in the Eastern Roman Empire: the date corresponds to Justinian’s closing of the philosophical school at Athens, a fact whose historicity is beyond doubt, and whose effects on the cultural life of the Greek East have been variously assessed.

Iberian Peninsula

Hispania had become part of the Roman Empire in the third century BC. In his Epistle to the Romans, the Apostle Paul speaks of his intent to travel there, but when, how, and even if this happened, is uncertain. Paul may have begun the Christianization of Spain, but it may have been begun by soldiers returning from Mauritania. However Christianization began, Christian communities can be found dating to the third century, and bishoprics had been created in León, Mérida and Zeragosa by that same period. In AD 300 an ecclesiastical council held in Elvira was attended by 20 bishops. With the end of persecution in 312, churches, baptistries, hospitals and episcopal palaces were erected in most major towns, and many landed aristocracy embraced the faith and converted sections of their villas into chapels.

In 416, the Germanic Visigoths crossed into Hispania as Roman allies. They converted to Arian Christianity shortly before 429. The Visigothic King Sisebut came to the throne in 612 when the Roman emperor Heraclius surrendered his Spanish holdings. The emperor had received a prophecy that the empire would be destroyed by a circumcised people; lacking awareness of Islam, he applied this to the Jews. Heraclius is said to have called upon Sisebut to banish all Jews who would not submit to baptism. Bouchier says 90,000 Hebrews were baptized while others fled to France or North Africa.

Despite early Christian testimonies and institutional organization, Christianization of the Basques was slow. Muslim accounts from the period of the Umayyad conquest of Hispania (711 – 718) up to the 9th century, indicate the Basques were not considered Christianized by the Muslims who called them magi or 'pagan wizards', rather than 'People of the Book' as Christians or Jews were.

Colonialization and secularization
Christianity and the various pagan religions co-existed and largely tolerated each other in most of the empire throughout the majority of the fourth and fifth centuries. The structure and ideals of both Church and State were transformed through this long period of symbiosis. By the time a fifth-century pope attempted to denounce the Lupercalia as 'pagan superstition', religion scholar Elizabeth Clark says "it fell on deaf ears". In Historian R. A. Markus's reading of events, this marked a colonialization by Christians of pagan values and practices. For Alan Cameron, the mixed culture that included the continuation of the circuses, amphitheaters and games – sans sacrifice – on into the sixth century involved the secularization of paganism rather than appropriation by Christianity.

Up to the time of Justin I and Justinian I (527 to 565), there was some toleration for all religions; there were anti-sacrifice laws, but they were not enforced. Thus, up into the sixth century, there still existed centers of paganism in Athens, Gaza, Alexandria, and elsewhere.

Christianization of Europe (6th–9th centuries)

Change in method
A shift in Christianization took place in 612 when the Visigothic King Sisebut declared the obligatory conversion of all Jews in Spain, contradicting Pope Gregory who had reiterated the traditional ban against forced conversion of the Jews in 591. Scholars refer to this shift as a "seismic moment" in Christianization.

Constantine had granted, through the Edict of Milan, the right to all people to follow whatever religion they wished. Also in the West, Emperor Gratian surrendered the title of Pontifex Maximus, the position of head priest of the empire. The religious policy of the Eastern emperor Justinian I (527 to 565) reflected his conviction that a unified Empire presupposed unity of faith.

Herrin asserts that, under Justinian, this involved considerable destruction. The decree of 528 had already barred pagans from state office when, decades later, Justinian ordered a "persecution of surviving Hellenes, accompanied by the burning of pagan books, pictures and statues" which took place at the Kynêgion. Herrin says it is difficult to assess the degree to which Christians are responsible for the losses of ancient documents in many cases, but in the mid-sixth century, active persecution in Constantinople destroyed many ancient texts.

According to Anthony Kaldellis, Justinian is often seen as a tyrant and despot. Unlike Constantine, Justinian did purge the bureaucracy of those who disagreed with him. He sought to centralize imperial government, became increasingly autocratic, and "nothing could be done", not even in the Church, that was contrary to the emperor's will and command. In Kaldellis' estimation, "Few emperors had started so many wars or tried to enforce cultural and religious uniformity with such zeal".

In the first half of the sixth century, Justinian came to Rome to liberate it from barbarians leading to a guerrilla war that lasted nearly 20 years. After fighting ended, Justinian used what is known as a Pragmatic Sanction to assert control over Italy. The Sanction effectively removed the supports that had allowed the senatorial aristocracy to retain power. The political and social influence of the Senate's aristocratic members thereafter disappeared, and by 630, the Senate ceased to exist, and its building was converted into a church. Bishops stepped into civic leadership in the Senator's places. The position and influence of the pope rose.

End of the Ancient world

Before the 800s, the Pope, as the 'Bishop of Rome,' had no special influence over bishops outside Rome and had not yet manifested as the central ecclesiastical power. From the late seventh to the middle of the eighth century, eleven of the thirteen men who held the position of Roman Pope were the sons of families from the East. Before they could be installed, these Popes had to be approved by the head of State, the Byzantine emperor. This is called the Byzantine papacy, and along with losses to Islam, and changes within Christianity itself, it helped put an end to Ancient Christianity. Most scholars agree the 7th and 8th centuries are when the 'end of the ancient world' is most conclusive and well documented. Christianity transformed into its eclectic medieval forms as exemplified by the creation of the Papal state, and the alliance between the papacy and the militant Frankish king Charlemagne.

Bulgaria

Christianity had taken root in the Balkans when it was part of the Roman Empire. When the Slavs entered the area and conquered it in the fifth century, they adopted the religion of those they had subdued. In 680, Khan Aspuruk, the leader of an ethnically mixed pagan tribe led an army of Proto-Bulgars across the Danube, conquering the Slavs. They settled, and the First Bulgarian Empire was founded in 680/1 with the capitol at Pliska. Over the next two centuries, they fought on and off to protect their borders from various tribes and Byzantium.

Omurtag became Khan in 814. He persecuted Christians, but war with Byzantium, and other wars to acquire territory, brought many Christian prisoners of war into the state. The histories say their faith in the face of extreme misery impressed some of their captors including one of Omurtag's sons who converted. Under Omurtag, Bulgaria and Byzantium maintained a 30-year peace treaty that allowed for more contact, and this increased Christian missionary activities. Christianity spread, while the nobility who were largely Proto-Bulgarians, remained steadfastly pagan.

Official Christianization began in 864/5 under Khan Boris I (852– 889) who had been baptized in 864 in the capital city, Pliska, by Byzantine priests. The need to secure the country's borders, at least from Byzantium, was compounded by the need for internal peace between the different ethnic groups. Boris I determined that imposing Christianity was the answer. The decision was partly military, partly domestic, and partly to diminish the power of the Proto-Bulgarian nobility. A number of nobles reacted violently; 52 were executed. After prolonged negotiations with both Rome and Constantinople, an autocephalous Bulgarian Orthodox Church was formed that used the newly created Cyrillic script to make the Bulgarian language the language of the Church.

Boris' eldest son, Vladimir, also called Rasate, probably ruled from 889 – 893. He was deposed in 893 amidst accusations he was planning to abandon the Christian faith. Scholars remain uncertain as to the veracity of the accusation. His younger brother Symeon, Boris' third son, replaced him, ruling from 893 to 927. He intensified the translation of Greek literature and theology into Bulgarian, and enabled the establishment of an intellectual circle called the school of Preslav. Symeon also led a series of wars against the Byzantines to gain official recognition of his Imperial title and the full independence of the Bulgarian Church. As a result of his victories in 927, the Byzantines finally recognized the Bulgarian Patriarchate.

Serbia

Serbs migrated to the Balkan Peninsula between the fifth and seventh centuries. Christianity had been introduced there under Roman rule, but the region had largely returned to paganism by then. Serbian tribes adopted Christianity very slowly. The first instance of mass baptism happened during the reign of Heraclius (610–641) by "elders of Rome" according to Constantine Porphyrogenitus in his annals (r. 913–959).

The full conversion of the Slavs dates to the time of Eastern Orthodox missionaries Saints Cyril and Methodius during the reign of the Byzantine emperor Basil I (r. 867–886). The Serbian prince Vlastimir (c. 830 until c. 851) was probably pagan as all his sons had pagan names. In the next generation of Serbian monarchs and nobles there are Petar Gojniković, Stefan Mutimirović, and Pavle Branović. Serbs were baptized sometime before Basil sent imperial admiral Nikita Orifas to Knez Mutimir for aid in the war against the Saracens in 869, after acknowledging the suzerainty of the Byzantine Empire. The fleets and land forces of Zahumlje, Travunia and Konavli (Serbian Pomorje) were sent to fight the Saracens who attacked the town of Ragusa (Dubrovnik) in 869, on the immediate request of Basil I, who was asked by the Ragusians for help.

The first diocese of Serbia, the Diocese of Ras, is mentioned in the ninth century. It's provenance is uncertain, but it was probably founded about 871. Serbia can certainly be seen as a Christian nation by 870.

Serbia was annexed by Bulgaria, becoming a Bulgarian province under Samuel of Bulgaria (997-1014), bringing with it the Cyrillic alphabet and Slav texts. The full Byzantine conquest that followed Samuel's rule did not alter that use of Slavic language and liturgy within the Serbian church.

The medieval Serbian state was created in the second half of the twelfth century.

Croatia
According to Constantine VII, Christianization of Croats began in the 7th century. Viseslav (r. 785–802), one of the first dukes of Croatia, left behind a special baptismal font, which symbolizes the acceptance of the church, and thereby Western culture, by the Croats. The conversion of Croatia is said to have been completed by the time of Duke Trpimir's death in 864. In 879, under duke Branimir, Croatia received papal recognition as a state from Pope John VIII.

The Narentine pirates, based on the Croatian coast, remained pagans until the late ninth century.

Hungarian historian László Veszprémy writes: "By the end of the 11th century, Hungarian expansion had secured Croatia, a country that was coveted by both the Venetian and Byzantine empires and had already adopted the Latin Christian faith. The Croatian crown was held by the Hungarian kings up to 1918, but Croatia retained its territorial integrity throughout. It is not unrelated that the borders of Latin Christendom in the Balkans have remained coincident with the borders of Croatia into present times".

Bohemia/Czech lands

What was Bohemia forms much of the Czech Republic, comprising the central and western portions of the country.

Evidence of Christianity in this region north of the Danube can be found dating from the time of Roman occupation in the second century. Christianity was developing organically until the arrival of the Huns in 433 which Christianity survived only to a small extent. From the 7th century, in the territory of contemporary Slovakia, (Great Moravia and its successor state Duchy of Bohemia), Christianization was sustained by the intervention of various missions from the Frankish Empire and Byzantine enclaves in Italy and Dalmatia.

Significant missionary activity only took place after Charlemagne defeated the Avar Khaganate several times at the end of the 8th century and beginning of the ninth centuries. A key event with significant influence on the Christianization of Slavs was the elevation of the Salzburg diocese to archdiocese by Charlemagne with permission from the Pope in 798.

The first Christian church of the Western and Eastern Slavs (known to written sources) was built in 828 by Pribina (c. 800–861) ruler and Prince of the Principality of Nitra. His career is recorded in the Conversion of the Bavarians and the Carantanians (a historical work written in 870). Pribina was driven out by Mojmír I in 833. Mojmír was baptized in 831 by Reginhar, Bishop of Passau. Despite formal endorsement by the elites, Great Moravian Christianity was described as containing many pagan elements as late as in 852.

Church organization was supervised by the Franks. Prince Rastislav's request for missionaries had been sent to Byzantine Emperor Michael III (842–867) in hopes of establishing a local church organization independent of Frankish clergy.

In the Christianization process of Bohemia, Moravia and Slovakia territories, the two Byzantine missionary brothers Saints Constantine-Cyril and Methodius played the key roles beginning in 863. They spent approximately 40 months in Great Moravia continuously translating texts and teaching students. Cyril developed the first Slavic alphabet and translated the Gospel into the Old Church Slavonic language. Old Church Slavonic became the first literary language of the Slavs and, eventually, the educational foundation for all Slavic nations.

In 869 Methodius was consecrated as (arch)bishop of Pannonia and the Great Moravia regions. In 880, Pope John VIII issued the bull Industriae Tuae, by which he set up the independent ecclesiastical province that Rastislav had hoped for, with Archbishop Methodius as its head. The independent archdiocese managed by Methodius was established only for a short time, but relics of this church organization withstood the fall of Great Moravia.

Christianization of Europe (10th - 14th centuries)

Historical background
The intense and rapid changes which occurred during the eleventh and twelfth centuries, including a "profound revolution in religious sentiment", are considered some of the most significant changes in the history of Christianization.

New monk new Christianization
The church of this era had immense authority, but the key to its power was a reformation movement that swept through Europe in the 900's. The reform movement created two images of the Benedictine ideal: the traditional contemplative, and the new monks, from new communities like the Dominicans, who saw their calling in terms of actively working to reform the world. This influenced the next 400 years of European history. The church's stated purpose had long been to change the heart of individual persons, not the social order, and ancient Christians had not thought of their movement in terms of social reform.

Dominicans came to dominate the new universities, traveled about preaching against heresy, and eventually became notorious for their participation in the Medieval Inquisition, the Albigensian Crusade and the Northern crusades. Christian policy denying the existence of witches and witchcraft would later be challenged by the Dominicans allowing them to participate in witch trials. The monk's new focus on reforming the world created a new form of Christianization evident in the conversion of East Central Europe. Throughout central and eastern Europe, Christianization and political centralization went hand in hand.

Christianization and political centralization

By 1150, a watershed period in European history had begun. Western culture became more secular. Kings began centralizing power into themselves and their nations. They accomplished this by taking legal, military, and social powers away from the aristocrats who had traditionally held those powers, turning them into powers belonging only to the king as the representative of the state. Centralization of power led all of Europe of the High Middle Ages to become a persecuting culture.  

Jews and homosexuals were among the first minorities to lose rights and be persecuted by law. A new rhetoric of exclusion based on stereotyping, stigmatization and even demonization of the accused were seen to legitimize and justify these attacks. Attitudes of the church toward the Jews changed in the 1200s, and the church no longer protected them. In 1215, the Fourth Lateran Council, known as the Great Council, met and accepted 70 canons (church laws). The last three canons required Jews to distinguish themselves from Christians in their dress, prohibited them from holding public office, and prohibited Jewish converts from continuing to practice Jewish rituals. As Berger has articulated it: "The other side of the coin of unique toleration was unique persecution." 

In the eleventh century, the kingdom of Jerusalem had spread a legal code ordaining death for "sodomites". From the 1250s onwards, a series of similar legal codes in the nation-states of Spain, France, Italy and Germany followed this example. Sociologist R. I. Moore writes that "By 1300, places where male sodomy was not a capitol offense had become the exception rather than the rule."

They were followed in the next few centuries by Gypsies, beggars, spendthrifts, prostitutes, and idle former soldiers. The church did not have the leading role in this persecution, but church leaders supported the kings through Christian rhetoric and new canon law.

By the 1300's, kings in France and England had been so successful at centralizing power by taking it from others that many governments wanted to imitate them, including the church's government. The popes of the fourteenth century worked to amass power into the papal position, building what is often called the papal monarchy. This was accomplished partly through the reorganization of the ecclesiastical financial system. The poor had previously been allowed to offer their tithes in goods and services, but these popes revamped the system to only accept money. A steady cash flow brought with it the power of great wealth. The papal states were thereafter governed by the pope in the same manner the secular powers governed. The pope became a pseudo-monarch.

These fourteenth century popes were greedy and politically corrupt, so that pious Christians of the period became disgusted, leading to the loss of papal prestige. Devoted and virtuous nuns and monks became increasingly rare. Monastic reform had been a major force in the High Middle Ages but is largely unknown in the Late Middle Ages. Christian missions are almost non-existent everywhere but Asia (Eastern Europe).

In Asia, the combination of Christianization and political centralization created what Peter Brown describes as, "specific micro-Christendoms". It did not only create new states, László Veszprémy says it also created "a new region which later became known as East Central Europe". Conversion began with local elites who wanted to convert because they gained prestige and power through matrimonial alliances and participation in imperial rituals. Christianity then spread from the center to the edges of society.

Historian Ivo Štefan writes that, "Although Christian authors often depicted the conversion of rulers as the triumph of the new faith, the reality was much more complex. Christianization of everyday life took centuries, with many non-Christian elements surviving in rural communities until the beginning of the modern era".

Poland
 

According to historians Franciszek Longchamps de Bérier and Rafael Domingo: "A pre-Christian Poland never existed. Poland entered history suddenly when some western lands inhabited by the Slavs embraced Christianity. Christianity was brought to the region by Dobrawa of Bohemia, the daughter of Boleslaus I the Cruel, Duke of Bohemia, when Duke Mieszko I was baptized and married her in 966."
 The dynastic interests of the Piasts produced the establishment of both church and state in Great Poland (Greater Poland, often known by its Polish name "Wielkopolska" is a historical region of west-central Poland. Its chief and largest city is Poznań.). That seems to have been a planned strategic decision.

The "Baptism of Poland" in 966, refers to the baptism of Mieszko I, the first ruler. "The young Christian state acquired its own Slavic martyr, Wojciech (known as Adalbert), in 1000, plus the archbishopric in Gniezno and four bishoprics (Poznań, Kraków, Wrocław and Kołobrzeg). This Christian state, the earliest attempt at Christianization in this region of Europe, lasted for roughly 70 years". Mieszko's baptism was followed by the building of churches and the establishment of an ecclesiastical hierarchy. Mieszko saw baptism as a way of strengthening his hold on power, with the active support he could expect from the bishops, as well as a unifying force for the Polish people.

Hungary

Christianity existed in what would become present day Hungary from the time of Roman rule. At the end of the ninth century, the Magyars occupied said territory finding widespread traces of Christianity amongst the Avar tribes, the Bulgars and the Slavs who had previously settled there; there is also historical evidence the Magyar people brought with them a prior knowledge of Christianity.

Around 952, the tribal chief Gyula II of Transylvania, visited Constantinople and was baptized, bringing home with him Hierotheus who was designated bishop of Turkia (Hungary). Medieval historian Phyllis G. Jestice writes that Gyula's son-in-law "Géza of Hungary became Duke of the Hungarians [around 970] and began a new open door policy to the west that made mission in that region possible for the first time". Some scholars say Géza used forced conversion, and ruthlessly removed pagan idols and cultic places, but there is little support as Géza is largely excluded from the historical record of Hungary's conversion. The conversion of Gyula at Constantinople and the missionary work of Bishop Hierotheus are depicted as leading directly to the court of St. Stephen, the first Hungarian king, a Christian in a still mostly pagan country.

While there is historiographical dispute over who actually converted the Hungarian people, King Stephen or the German Emperor Henry II, there is agreement that the realm King Stephen inherited had no established church system, and that monarchy was a break from the "old law". Stephen suppressed rebellion, organized both the Hungarian State (establishing strong royal authority), and the church, by inviting missionaries, and suppressing paganism by making laws requiring the people to attend church every Sunday. Soon the Hungarian Kingdom had two archbishops and 8 bishops, and a defined state structure with province governors that answered to the King. Stephen opened the frontiers of his Kingdom in 1016 to the pilgrims that traveled by land to the Holy Land, and soon this route became extremely popular, being used later in the Crusades. Stephen often personally met pilgrims and invited them to stay in Hungary. Saint Stephen was the first Hungarian monarch elevated to sainthood for his Christian characteristics and not because he suffered a martyr's death.

The beginning of the 11th century marks the end of the first stage of the founding of church and state in Hungary. Hungarian Christianity and the kingdom's ecclesiastical and temporal administrations consolidated towards the end of the 11th century, especially under Ladislas I and Coloman when the feudal order was finally established, the first saints were canonized, and new dioceses were founded.

Kievan Rus'

In 945, Igor, the duke of the Rus', entered a trade agreement with Byzantium in exchange for soldiers, and when those mercenaries returned, they brought Christianity with them. Duchess Olga was the first member of the ruling family to accept baptism, ca. 950 in Constantinople, but it did not spread immediately.

Around 978, Vladimir (978–1015), the son of Sviatoslav, seized power in Kiev. Slavic historian Ivo Štefan writes that, Vladimir examined monotheism for himself, and "Around that same time, Vladimir conquered Cherson in the Crimea, where, according to the Tale of Bygone Years, he was baptized". After returning to Kiev, the same text describes Vladimir as unleashing "a systematic destruction of pagan idols and the construction of Christian churches in their place".

Bohemia, Poland, and Hungary had become part of western Latin Christianity, while the Rus' adopted Christianity from Byzantium, leading them down a different path. A specific form of Rus' Christianity formed quickly. The Rus' dukes maintained exclusive control of the church which was financially dependent upon them. The prince appointed the clergy to positions in government service; satisfied their material needs; determined who would fill the higher ecclesiastical positions; and directed the synods of bishops in the Kievan metropolitanate. This new Christian religious structure was imposed upon the socio-political and economic fabric of the land by the authority of the state's rulers. According to Andrzej Poppe, Slavic historian, it is fully justifiable to call the Church of Rus' a state church. The Church strengthened the authority of the Prince, and helped to justifiy the expansion of Kievan empire into new territories through missionary activity.

Clergy formed a new layer in the hierarchy of society. They taught Christian values, a Christian world view, the intellectual traditions of Antiquity, and translated religious texts into local vernacular language which introduced literacy to all members of the princely dynasty, including women, as well as the populace. Monasteries of the twelfth century became key spiritual, intellectual, art, and craft centers. Under Vladimir’s son Yaroslav I the Wise (1016–1018, 1019–1054), a building and cultural boom took place. The Church of Rus' gradually developed into an independent political force in the twelfth and thirteenth centuries.

Scandinavia (Sweden, Norway and Denmark)

Before Christianity arrived, there was a common Scandinavian culture with only regional differences. Early Scandinavian loyalties, of the Viking Age (793–1066 AD) and the early medieval period (6th to 10th century), were determined by warfare, temporary treaties, marriage alliances and wealth. Having nothing equivalent to modern borders, kings rose and fell based primarily on their ability to gain wealth for their people.

Christianization of Scandinavia is divided into two stages by Professor of medieval archaeology Alexandra Sanmark. Stage 1 involves missionaries who arrive in pagan territory, on their own, without secular support. This began during the Carolingian era (800s). However, early Scandinavians had been in contact with the Christian world as far back as the Migration Period (AD 375 (possibly as early as 300) to 568), and later during the Viking Age, long before the first documented missions.

Florence Harmer writes that "Between A.D. 960 and 1008 three Scandinavian kings were converted to Christianity". The Danish King Harald Gormsen (Bluetooth) was baptized c. 960. The conversion of Norway was begun by Hákon Aðalsteinsfostri between 935 and 961, but the wide-scale conversion of this kingdom was undertaken by King Olav Tryggvason in c. 995. In Sweden, King Olof Erikson Skötkonung accepted Christianity around 1000.

According to Peter Brown, Scandinavians adopted Christianity of their own accord c.1000. Anders Winroth accepts this view, explaining that Iceland became the model for the institutional conversion of the rest of Scandinavia after the farmers voted to adopt Christian law at the Assembly at Thingvellir in AD 1000. Winroth demonstrates that Scandinavians were not passive recipients of the new religion, but were instead converted to Christianity because it was in individual chieftains' political, economic, and cultural interests to do so.

Women were important and influential early converts. Scandinavian women might have found Christianity more appealing than Norse religion for a variety of reasons: Valhalla was unavailable to the majority of women; infanticide of female infants was a common practice, and it was forbidden within Christianity; Christianity had a generally less violent message, and it inserted "gender equality into marriage and sexual relations".

Although Scandinavians became nominally Christian, it would take considerably longer for actual Christian beliefs to establish themselves among the people. Archaeological excavations of burial sites on the island of Lovön near modern-day Stockholm have shown that the actual Christianization of the people was very slow and took at least 150–200 years. Thirteenth-century runic inscriptions from the bustling merchant town of Bergen in Norway show little Christian influence, and one of them appeals to a Valkyrie.

Stage 2 begins when a secular ruler takes charge of Christianization in their territory, and ends when a defined and organized ecclesiastical network is established. For Scandinavia, the emergence of a stable ecclesiastical organization is also marked by closer links with the papacy. Archbishoprics were founded in Lund (1103/04), Nidaros (1153), and Uppsala (1164), and in 1152/3, Cardinal Nicholas Breakspear was sent as a papal legate to Norway and Sweden. By 1350, Scandinavia was an integral part of Western Christendom.

Baltic wars

From the days of Charlemagne (747-814), the people around the Baltic Sea had raided – stealing crucial resources, killing, and enslaving captives – from the countries that surrounded them including Denmark, Prussia, Germany and Poland. In the eleventh century, German and Danish nobles united to put a stop to the raiding, in an attempt to force peace through military action, but it didn't last.

When the Pope (Blessed) Eugenius III (1145–1153) called for a Second Crusade in response to the fall of Edessa in 1144, Saxon nobles refused to go. They wanted to go back to subduing Baltic Tribes instead. These rulers did not see crusading as a moral, faith based duty as western crusaders did. They saw holy war as a tool for territorial expansion, alliance building, and the empowerment of their own young church and state. Succession struggles would have left them vulnerable at home while they were gone, and the longer pilgrimage could not benefit them with those things that crusading at home would. In 1147, Eugenius' Divini dispensatione, gave the eastern nobles full crusade indulgences to go to the Baltic area instead of the Levant. The Northern, (or Baltic), Crusades followed, taking place, off and on, with and without papal support, from 1147 to 1316.

Law professor Eric Christiansen indicates the primary motivation for these wars was the noble's desire for territorial expansion and wealth in the form of land, furs, amber, slaves, and tribute. Taking the time for peaceful conversion did not fit in with these plans. Conversion by these princes was almost always a result of conquest, either by the direct use of force, or indirectly, when a leader converted and required it of his followers.

Monks and priests had to work with the secular rulers on the ruler's terms. According to Fonnesberg-Schmidt, "While the theologians maintained that conversion should be voluntary, there was a widespread pragmatic acceptance of conversion obtained through political pressure or military coercion". Acceptance led some commentators to endorse and approve coerced conversions, something that had not been done in the church before this time. Dominican friars helped with this ideological justification by offering a portrayal of the pagans as possessed by evil spirits. In this manner, they could assert that pagans were in need of conquest in order to free them from their terrible circumstance; then they could be peacefully converted. There were often severe consequences for populations that chose to resist.

Iberian Reconquista

Between 711 and 718, the Iberian peninsula had been conquered by Muslims in the Umayyad conquest. Spain and Sicily are the only European regions to have experienced Islamic conquest. The blended Muslim, Christian and Jewish cultures that resulted from the eighth century onward left a profound imprint on Spain. 

The centuries long military struggle to reclaim the peninsula from Muslim rule, called the Reconquista, took place until the Christian Kingdoms, that would later become Spain and Portugal, reconquered the Moorish states of Al-Ándalus in 1492 (see: Battle of Covadonga in 722 and the Conquest of Granada in 1492).

Isabel and Ferdinand united the country with themselves as its first royalty quickly establishing the Spanish Inquisition in order to consolidate state interest. The Spanish inquisition was originally authorized by the Pope, yet the initial inquisitors proved so severe that the Pope almost immediately opposed it; to no avail. Ferdinand is said to have pressured the Pope, and in October 1483, a papal bull conceded control of the inquisition to the Spanish crown. According to Spanish historian José Casanova, the Spanish inquisition became the first truly national, unified and centralized state institution. After the 1400s, few Spanish inquisitors were from the religious orders.

Romania
Romania became Christian in a gradual manner beginning when Rome conquered the province of Dacia (106-107). The Romans brought Latinization through intense and massive colonization. Rome withdrew in the third century, then the Slavs reached Dacia in the 6th to 7th centuries and were eventually assimilated. By the 8th to 9th centuries, Romanians existed in a "frontier" on the other side of the Carpathian mountains between Latin, Catholic Europe and the Byzantine, Orthodox East. During most of this period, being Christian allowed its relative observance in parallel with the continued observance of some pagan customs.

Missionaries from south of the Danube moved north spreading their western faith and their Latin language. In the last two decades of the 9th century, missionaries Clement and Naum, (who were disciples of the brothers Cyril and Methodius who had converted the Old Slavic language to a written form in 863), had arrived in the region spreading the Cyrillic alphabet. By the 10th century when the Bulgarian Tsars extended their territory to include Transylvania, they were able to impose the Bulgarian church model and its Slavic language without opposition. Nearly all Romanian words concerning Christian faith have Latin roots, while words regarding the organization of the church are Slavonic.

Romanian historian Ioan-Aurel Pop writes that "Christian fervor and the massive conversion to Christianity among the Slavs may have led to the canonic conversion of the last heathen, or ecclesiastically unorganized, Romanian islands". For Romanians, the church model was "overwhelming, omnipresent, putting pressure on the Romanians and often accompanied by a political element". This ecclesiastical and political tradition continued until the 19th century.

Albania
Albanian historian Robert Elsie writes that, "In a book published in 1994, German professor Gottfried Schramm (b. 1929) linked the Albanians to the ancient Bessi or Bessoi (Gk. Βέσσοι or Βῆσσοι), a Thracian tribe living around ancient Remesiana (Bela Palanka) in the current Serbian-Bulgarian-Macedonian border region. According to Schramm, these Bessi were converted to Christianity very early" by Nicetas the Bishop of Remesiana, "and were later pushed westward into Albania in the early ninth century" bringing their religion with them. The history of Albania by Movses Daskhurantsi or Kaghankatvatsi insists on the apostolic origin of Albanian Christianity through St. Elisaeus (Eghishe). However, most scholars agree that Christianity was officially adopted in AD 313 or AD 315 when Gregory the Illuminator baptized the Albanian king and ordained the first bishop Tovmas, the founder of the Albanian church. It is highly probable that Christianization covered the whole of antique Albania by the late fourth century.

According to Elsie, Albania found itself on the cultural border that separated Latin influence to the north from Greek influence to the south. The dividing line between the two, known to historians as the Jireček Line, ran through Albania from around Laç (between Tirana and Lezha) in an easterly, slightly north-easterly direction. North of this line one encounters inscriptions primarily in Latin, whereas south of the line, and more overwhelmingly south of the Shkumbin valley, one encounters inscriptions in Greek. As a cultural divide, the Jireček Line still finds its reflection in Albania today. Christian Albanians to the north of it are Catholic in their vast majority, whereas Christian Albanians to the south of it are almost all Orthodox.

Lithuania

The last of the Baltic crusades was the conflict between the mostly German Teutonic Order and Lithuania in the far northeastern reaches of Europe. Lithuania is sometimes described as "the last pagan nation in medieval Europe".

The Teutonic Order was a crusading organization for the Christian Holy Land founded by members of the Knights Hospitaller. Medieval historian Aiden Lilienfeld says "In 1226, however, the Duke of Mazovia (in modern-day Poland) granted the Order territory in eastern Prussia in exchange for help in subjugating pagan Baltic peoples".

Lilienfeld says "their status as a crusading “monastic” order meant that they could only claim autonomy and legitimacy so long as they could convince the other European Catholic states, from whom they received recruits and financial support, that the Order had a job to do: to convert pagan populations that Catholic rulers perceived to be a threat to Christendom. The greatest of these perceived threats was the Grand Duchy of Lithuania."

Over the course of the next 200 years, the Order expanded its territory to cover much of the eastern Baltic coast.

In 1384, the ten year old daughter of Louis the Great, King of Hungary and Poland, and his wife, Elizabeth of Bosnia, named Jadwiga, was crowned king of Poland. One year later, a marriage was arranged between her and the Grand Duke Jogaila of Lithuania. Jogaila was baptized, married, and crowned king in 1386 beginning the 400 year shared history of Poland and Lithuania. This would seem to obviate the need for the Order's crusade, yet activity against local populations, particularly the Samogition peoples of the eastern Baltic, continued in a frequently brutal manner.

The Teutonic Order eventually fell to Poland-Lithuania in 1525. Lilienfeld says that "After this, the Order’s territory was divided between Poland-Lithuania and the Hohenzollern dynasty of Brandenburg, putting an end to the monastic state and the formal Northern Crusade. All of the Order’s most powerful cities–Danzig (Gdansk), Elbing (Elblag), Marienburg (Malbork), and Braunsberg (Braniewo)–now fall within Poland in the 21st century, except for Koenigsburg (Kaliningrad) in Russia."

Early colonialism (1500s -1700s)
Following the geographic discoveries of the 1400's and 1500's, increasing population and inflation led the emerging nation-states of Portugal, Spain, and France, the Dutch Republic, and England to explore, conquer, colonize and exploit the newly discovered territories. While colonialism was primarily economic and political, it opened the door for Christian missionaries who soon followed. These missionaries were not officially sent out as agents of colonial governments, and there were differing levels of missionary support and opposition to colonialism within different states, yet there is enough evidence of support and cooperation with colonialist ideas, for Christianization to be seen as an aspect of colonialism.

There is also evidence of missionary opposition to colonialism. Missions, in Sanneh's view, were "colonialism's Achilles heel, not its shield". According to historical theologian Justo Gonzales, colonialism and missions each sometimes aided and sometimes impeded the other.

Different state actors created colonies that varied widely. Some colonies had institutions that allowed native populations to reap some benefits. Others became extractive colonies with predatory rule that produced an autocracy with a dismal record.

Portugal and Spain

Under Spanish and Portuguese rule, creating a Christian Commonwealth was the goal of missions. This included a significant role, from the beginning of colonial rule, played by Catholic missionaries. 

Portugal practiced extractive colonialism. Early attempts at Christianization were not very successful, and those who had been converted were not well instructed. In the church's view, this led them into "errors and misunderstandings". In December 1560, the Portuguese Inquisition arrived in Goa, India. This was largely the result of the crown's fear that converted Jews were becoming dominant in Goa and might ally with Ottoman Jews to threaten Portuguese control of the spice trade. After 1561 the Inquisition had a practical monopoly over heresy, and its "policy of terror ... was reflected in the approximately 15,000 trials which took place between 1561 and 1812, involving more than 200 death sentences."

The Spanish military was known for its ill-treatment of Amerindians. Spanish missionaries are generally credited with championing efforts to initiate protective laws for the Indians and for working against their enslavement. This led to debate on the nature of human rights. In 16th-century Spain the issue resulted in a crisis of conscience and the birth of modern international law.

In words of outrage similar to those earlier missionaries, Junipero Serra wrote of the depredations of the soldiers against Indian women in California in 1770. Following through on missionary complaints, Viceroy Bucareli  drew up the first regulatory code of California, the Echeveste Regulations.  Missionary opposition and military prosecution failed to protect the Amerindian women. On the one hand, California missionaries sought to protect the Amerindians from exploitation by the conquistadores, soldiers and colonists. On the other hand, Jesuits, Fransiscans and other orders relied on corporal punishment and an institutionalized racialism for training the "untamed savages".

A catastrophe was wrought upon the Amerindians by contact with Europeans. Old World diseases like smallpox, measles, malaria and many others spread through Indian populations. "In most of the New World 90 percent or more of the native population was destroyed by wave after wave of previously unknown afflictions. Explorers and colonists did not enter an empty land but rather an emptied one".

France
In the seventeenth century, the French used assimilation as a means of establishing colonies controlled by the state rather than private companies. Within the context of western geocentrism, assimilation (integration of a small group into a larger one) has been used to legitimize European colonization morally and politically for centuries. It advocated multiple aspects of European culture such as "civility, social organization, law, economic development, civil status," dress, bodily description, religion and more to the exclusion of local culture.

Their goal was a political and religious community representative of an ideal society as articulated through the progressive theory of history. This common theory of the time asserts that history shows the normal progression of society is toward constant betterment; that humans could therefore eventually be perfected; that primitive nations could be forced to become modern states wherein that would happen.

This was linked with the emergence of the modern state and was instrumental in the development of racialism as an explanation of the failure of Christianization.

The Dutch Republic
The Dutch Reformed church was not a dominant influence in the Dutch colonies. However, the Dutch East Indies Trading Company used assimilation in its Asian port towns, encouraging intermarriage and cultural uniformity, to establish colonies.

Britain
Great Britain's colonial expansion was for the most part driven by commercial ambitions and competition with France. Investors saw converting the natives as a secondary concern. Laura Stevens writes that British missions were more talk than walk. From the beginning, the British talked (and wrote) a great deal about converting native populations, but actual efforts were few and feeble. These missions were universally Protestant, were based on belief in the traditional duty to "teach all nations", the sense of obligation to extend the benefits of Christianity to heathen lands just as Europe itself had been "civilized" centuries before, and a fervent pity for those who had never heard the gospel. Historian Jacob Schacter says "ambivalent benevolence" was at the heart of most British and American attitudes toward native Americans. The British did not create widespread conversion.

New imperialism (19th and 20th centuries)

Beginning in the mid-nineteenth century, New Imperialism was a second wave of colonialism that lasted until World War II. Economists Jan Henryk Pierskalla and Alexander de Juan write that "Early colonial encounters in the Americas of the fifteenth century had little in common with colonization in Africa during the age of the “New Imperialism".” During this time, colonial powers gained territory at almost three times the rate of the earlier period.

By 1914, these empires extended over 85% of the globe. The two largest and most powerful empires were the British empire and the Japanese empire. "In addition to colonial rule, other means of domination were exercised in the form of spheres of influence, special commercial treaties, and the subordination that lenders often impose on debtor nations".

The sixteenth century had been the "great age of Catholic expansion" whereas the nineteenth century was that for Protestantism.

Germany
As a latecomer to the Scramble for Africa, Germany’s main interest was in making its colonies secure rather than to maximize extraction. Germany largely focused on the idea that disturbances could be interpreted as a sign of weakness by its international rivals.

Colonies in the Americas, Africa, Asia and the Pacific 

Settler colonialism is a distinct type of colonialism that replaces indigenous populations with a settler society. Settler colonial states include Canada, the United States, Australia, and South Africa.

American colonialism
The beginning of American Protestant missions abroad followed the sailing of William Carey from England to India in 1793 after the Great awakening. An even greater effort was made to evangelize America itself. However, Christianization was often mingled with Americanization creating ambiguity and other problems.

For example, a peace treaty with the Cherokee in 1794 stimulated a cultural revival and the welcoming of white missionaries. Mark Noll has written that "what followed was a slow but steady acceptance of the Christian faith". Both Christianization and the Cherokee people received a fatal blow after the discovery of gold in north Georgia in 1828. Cherokee land was seized by the government, sold to white settlers and the Cherokee people were transported in what became known as the Trail of tears.

Missionaries played a crucial role in the acculturation of the Cherokee and other American Indians. Historian William Gerald McLoughlin has written that, humanitarians who saw the decline of indigenous people with regret, advocated education and assimilation as the native's only hope for survival.

The history of boarding schools for the indigenous populations in Canada and the US is not generally good. While the majority of native children did not attend boarding school at all, of those that did, recent studies indicate some found happiness and refuge while others found suffering and abuse.

Over time, many missionaries came to respect the virtues of native culture. "After 1828, most missionaries found it difficult to defend the policies of their government" writes McLoughlin.

Global Christianization
Mark Boyle writes that: Christianity's historical alignment with the Western project and [the overlapping] histories of colonialism and imperialism raises questions about its capacity to serve as a progressive force in global affairs today. Placing Christianity under postcolonial scrutiny, ... Christianity offers a variety of complex, contradictory, and competing approaches to peace building that variously defend the hegemonic ambitions of the West on the one hand, and support critical practices that usurp and decenter the sovereign supremacy assumed by the West on the other.

Impact of colonialism
Sociologists have identified the key role of Christian missionaries, in particular Protestant missionaries, in generating a democratic legacy for many former colonies, through the spread of literacy, mass printing, and voluntary organizations. Although contact with Christian missionaries might have had beneficial long-term effects for human capital, political participation, and eventually democratization, contact with the colonial slave trade has had pernicious effects.

Some of the different colonial practices, along with the pre-existing conditions in the colonial states, have had long-term negative impact on modern post-colonial countries in their economic development, their democracy, and the ability of their government to accomplish policy goals. The political legacies of colonialism include political instability, violence, and ethnic exclusion which is also linked to civil strife and civil war.

Decolonization
Just as Christianization had a role in colonialism, it has also played a central role in decolonization moving former colonies toward independence. Shifting beliefs about Christianity's role in empire began in France in the 1930's and 40's. Christians were rethinking the relationship between religion and politics. From the 1960's onward, this new understanding of theology combined with Christian activism, was instrumental in motivating indigenous people, such as the Algerians, to work toward and fight for independence from foreign governments. This in turn, influenced global trends. In many colonial societies, Christian missionaries played a transformative role in the development of decolonization and post-colonial Christianity.

In the post-colonial world, it has become necessary for Christianization to break free of its colonial moorings, says Sanneh.

Third wave Christianization 
In the early twenty-first century, Christianity is declining in the West and growing in former colonial lands. In 1900 under colonial rule there were just under 9 million Christians in Africa. By 1960, and the end of colonialism there were about 60 million. By 2005, African Christians had increased to 393 million, about half of the continent's total population at that time. Population in Africa has continued to grow with the percentage of Christians remaining at about half in 2022. Christianity has become the most diverse, pluralist, fastest growing religion in the world.

The Bible and other Christian writings have been translated into more than 3000 of the world's 7000 languages. Approximately 90% of those languages have a written grammar and a dictionary only because of missionaries working with indigenous people to create them while doing those translations. Tracing the impact of this on local native cultures shows it has produced "the movements of indigenization and cultural liberation". "The translated scripture ... has become the benchmark of awakening and renewal".

According to Sanneh, this means that western missionaries pioneered the "largest, most diverse and most vigorous movement of cultural renewal in history".

Christianization is now being practiced by Third World countries sending missionaries in an effort to re-evangelize the secular West.

Sacred sites

In Late Antique Roman Empire, sites already consecrated as pagan temples or mithraea began being converted into Christian churches. Scholarship has been divided over whether this represents Christianization as a general effort to demolish the pagan past, was instead simple pragmatism, or perhaps an attempt to preserve the past's art and architecture, or some combination.

Sulpicius Severus, in his Vita describes Martin of Tours as a dedicated destroyer of temples and sacred trees, saying "wherever he destroyed heathen temples, there he used immediately to build either churches or monasteries". There is a discrepancy between the written text and archaeology, however, as none of the churches attributed to Martin can be shown to have existed in Gaul in the fourth century.

R. P. C. Hanson says the direct conversion of temples into churches did not begin until the mid fifth century in any but a few isolated incidents. It is likely this timing stems from the fact that these buildings and places remained officially in public use, ownership could only be transferred by the emperor, and temples remained protected by law.

According to modern archaeology, 120 pagan temples were converted to churches in the whole of the empire, out of the thousands of temples that existed, with the majority of those conversions dated after the fifth century. In the fourth century, there were no conversions of temples in the city of Rome itself. It is only with the formation of the Papal State in the eighth century, (when the emperor’s properties in the West came into the possession of the bishop of Rome), that the conversions of temples in Rome took off in earnest. According to Dutch historian Feyo L. Schuddeboom, individual temples and temple sites in the city were converted to churches primarily to preserve their exceptional architecture. They were also used pragmatically because of the importance of their location at the center of town.

When Benedict moved to Monte Cassino about 530, a small temple with a sacred grove and a separate altar to Apollo stood on the hill. The population was still mostly pagan. The land was most likely granted as a gift to Benedict from one of his supporters. This would explain the authoritative way he immediately cut down the groves, removed the altar, and built an oratory before the locals were converted.

Christianizing native religious, cultural activities and beliefs became official in the sixth century. This argument (in favor of what in modern terms is syncretism), is preserved in the Venerable Bede's Historia ecclesiastica gentis Anglorum in the form of a letter from Pope Gregory to Mellitus (d.604). L. C. Jane has translated Bede's text: Tell Augustine that he should by no means destroy the temples of the gods but rather the idols within those temples. Let him, after he has purified them with holy water, place altars and relics of the saints in them. For, if those temples are well built, they should be converted from the worship of demons to the service of the true God. Thus, seeing that their places of worship are not destroyed, the people will banish error from their hearts and come to places familiar and dear to them in acknowledgement and worship of the true God. Bede, Historia ecclesiastica gentis Anglorum (1.30) 
Richard A. Fletcher suggests that Holy wells developed out of a like adaptation. The British Isles and other areas of northern Europe that were formerly druidic are still densely punctuated by holy wells and holy springs that are now attributed to a saint, often a highly local saint unknown elsewhere. In earlier times many of these were seen as guarded by supernatural forces such as the melusina, and many such pre-Christian holy wells appear to survive as baptistries.

By 771, Charlemagne had inherited the three-century long conflict with the Saxons who regularly specifically targeted churches and monasteries in brutal raids into Frankish territory. In January 772, Charlemagne retaliated with an attack on the Saxon's most important holy site, a sacred grove in southern Engria. "It was dominated by the Irminsul (‘Great Pillar’), which was either a (wooden) pillar or an ancient tree and presumably symbolized Germanic religion’s ‘Universal Tree’. The Franks cut down the Irminsul, looted the accumulated sacrificial treasures (which the King distributed among his men), and torched the entire grove... Charlemagne ordered a Frankish fortress to be erected at the Eresburg".

The practice of replacing pagan beliefs and motifs with Christian, and purposefully not recording the pagan history (such as the names of pagan gods, or details of pagan religious practices), has been compared to the practice of damnatio memoriae.

Symbolism

During the Reconquista and the Crusades, the cross served the symbolic function of possession that a flag would occupy today. In an account written by Osbernus at the siege of Lisbon in 1147, he recorded that a mixed group of Christians took the city: "What great joy and what a great abundance there was of pious tears when, to the praise and honor of God and of the most Holy Virgin Mary the saving cross was placed atop the highest tower to be seen by all as a symbol of the city's subjection."

The cross is currently the most common symbol of Christianity, and has been for many centuries. It came to prominence during the 4th century (301 to 400 AD), and is the most familiar and widely recognized symbol of Christianity today.

Ancient pagan funeral rituals often remained within Christian culture as aspects of custom and community with very little alteration. Pagan rituals symbolized grief through wailing and loud lamentation. Gregory of Nyssa modified this practice into antiphonal singing of psalms and hymns.

Pagans and Jews decorated their burial chambers, so Christians did as well, thereby creating the first Christian art in the catacombs beneath Rome. This art is symbolic, rising out of a reinterpretation of Jewish and pagan symbolism.

While many new subjects appear for the first time in the Christian catacombs - i.e. the Good Shepherd, Baptism, and the Eucharistic meal - the Orant figures (women praying with upraised hands) probably came directly from pagan art.

The Ichthys, Christian Fish, also known colloquially as the Jesus Fish, was an early Christian secret symbol. Early Christians used the Ichthys symbol to identify themselves as followers of Jesus Christ and to proclaim their commitment to Christianity. Ichthys is the Ancient Greek word for "fish," which explains why the sign resembles a fish; the Greek word ιχθυς is an acronym for the phrase transliterated as "Iesous Christos Theou Yios Soter", that is, "Jesus Christ, God's Son, the Savior". There are several other possible connections with Christian tradition relating to this symbol: that it was a reference to the feeding of the multitude; that it referred to some of the apostles having previously been fishermen; or that the word Christ was pronounced by Jews in a similar way to the Hebrew word for fish (though Nuna is the normal Aramaic word for fish, making this seem unlikely).

Notes

See also

 Anti-paganism policies of the early Byzantine Empire
 Christianity and other religions
 Christianity and violence
 Forcible conversion to Christianity
 History of Christianity
 History of Christian thought on persecution and tolerance
 Role of Christianity in civilization
 Spread of Christianity
 Conquistador
 Crusades
 European colonization of the Americas
 Goa Inquisition
 Inculturation
 Missions
 Taiping Rebellion
 Christianization of Anglo-Saxon England
 Christianization of England
 Christianization of Ireland
 Christianization of the Celtic peoples
 Christianization of Roman (Southern) France
 Christianization of Bavaria
 Christianization of the Netherlands
 Christianization of the Swiss
 Christianization of Lithuania
 Christianization of the Faroe Islands
 Christianization of the Basque people
 Christianization of Iceland
 Christianization of Scandinavia
 Christianization of Finland
 Christianization of Kievan Rus'
 Christianization of the Rus' Khaganate
 Christianization of Poland
 Christianization of Bulgaria
 Christianization of Armenia
 Christianization of Goa
 Christianization of Tonga
In other religions
 History of religion
 Religious violence
 Islamization
 Judaism

References

Bibliography

External links
 Jorge Quiroga and Monica R. Lovelle, "Ciudades atlánticas en transición: La "ciudad" tardo-antigua y alto-medieval en el noroeste de la Península Ibérica (s.V-XI)" from Archeologia Medievale vol xxvii (1999), pp 257–268 Christianizing Late Antique Roman sites from the 6th century onwards.
Unilineal Descent Groups and Deep Christianization: A Cross-Cultural Comparison

 
Christian terminology